Sílvio César Ferreira da Costa (born 6 March 1970), simply known as Sílvio, is a Brazilian former professional footballer who played as a forward. With Olympic Beirut, he was the 2002–03 Lebanese Premier League top scorer with 18 goals.

Honours 
Individual
 Lebanese Premier League Team of the Season: 2002–03
 Lebanese Premier League top scorer: 2002–03

References

External links
 
 

1970 births
Living people
Footballers from Rio de Janeiro (city)
Brazilian footballers
Association football forwards
Campeonato Brasileiro Série A players
Campeonato Brasileiro Série B players
Fluminense FC players
Clube Atlético Bragantino players
La Liga players
Logroñés CF footballers
Paraná Clube players
Grêmio Foot-Ball Porto Alegrense players
Guarani FC players
Goiás Esporte Clube players
Clube Atlético Mineiro players
Sport Club Internacional players
Primeira Liga players
S.C. Braga players
Esporte Clube Bahia players
Associação Desportiva São Caetano players
São José Esporte Clube players
Sociedade Esportiva do Gama players
Clube de Regatas Brasil players
Associação Atlética Coruripe players
Olympic Beirut players
Lebanese Premier League players
Brazil international footballers
1991 Copa América players
Brazilian expatriate footballers
Expatriate footballers in Spain
Brazilian expatriate sportspeople in Spain
Expatriate footballers in Portugal
Brazilian expatriate sportspeople in Portugal
Expatriate footballers in Lebanon
Brazilian expatriate sportspeople in Lebanon
Lebanese Premier League top scorers